The Brockville Railway Tunnel, also called the Brockville Tunnel, is a former railway tunnel located beneath the downtown of Brockville, Ontario, Canada. It is the first railway tunnel built in Canada; construction began in September 1854 and the first train passed through the tunnel on December 31, 1860. Since 2017 it has been opened to the public as a free seasonal tourist attraction.

The tunnel runs in a north/south direction from Water Street, for a distance of 527 m (1,730 ft). It passes underneath what is now Brockville City Hall, built in 1863–64 as the Victoria Hall. It was built by the Brockville and Ottawa Railway.  The tunnel was designed to provide a rail link from the timber trade of the Ottawa Valley to the Brockville port facilities on the St. Lawrence River ship route.

The Brockville and Ottawa Railway, incorporated in 1853, ran from Brockville, through Smiths Falls, to Sand Point, near Arnprior, with a branch line from Smiths Falls to Perth. Its first B&OR train left Brockville on January 25, 1859, almost two years before finances permitted completion of the tunnel. The Brockville and Ottawa Railway amalgamated in 1878 with the Canada Central Railway, which was absorbed in 1881 by the Canadian Pacific Railway (CPR).

The rail line through the tunnel was later used by special height-shortened steam engines, and then diesel trains into the mid-1970s. The rails and ties were then sold and removed in the 1980s, and the railway tunnel was no longer used as it was built. In 1982, the tunnel was turned over to the City of Brockville by Marathon Realty, the real-estate wing of the Canadian Pacific Railway.

In 2016–17, the railway tunnel underwent a major interior rehabilitation to make it possible to travel safely through it on foot. Visitors can now walk from the south portal to the north portal, exiting at the north-end gorge and up a ramp to street level. Prior to the rehabilitation visitors were only able to enter at the south portal and walk a short distance underground.

The railway tunnel has received thousands of visitors since it opened completely on August 12, 2017. It now features a modern LED coloured light system, which is programmed in various ways, along with a recorded music track playing while one walks through.

Adjacent to the tunnel is a refurbished CPR caboose or van, that was donated in 1987 to the city by the Canadian Pacific Railway. A detailed plaque, in both English and French, describes the details and story of how cabooses were formerly part of every train. Today the caboose operates as an escape room experience.

References

External links
 The Brockville Tunnel Historic Plaque
 Official website

Railway tunnels in Ontario
Canadian Pacific Railway tunnels
Buildings and structures in Brockville
Tunnels completed in 1860
Rail transport in Brockville
Tourist attractions in Leeds and Grenville United Counties
Rail infrastructure in Leeds and Grenville United Counties
History of rail transport in Leeds and Grenville United Counties